ITB or variant, may refer to:

Travel, transportation, vehicles
 "Improved Touring B", a racing class in the race car series Improved Touring
 Integrated tug-barge, a type of tugboat and ocean-going barge
 individual throttle body, a throttle unit for an engine cylinder
 ITB Berlin, a travel industry trade show
 Itaituba Airport (IATA airport code: ITB; ICAO airport code: SBIH), Itaituba, Brazil
 Interbrasil STAR (IATA airline code: Q9; ICAO airline code: ITB), Brazilian airline
 Întreprinderea de Transport București, a former name of the Bucharest public transit company Societatea de Transport București

Organizations
 Inside the Box Board Games, a UK game publisher
 I, the Breather (ItB), a U.S. metalcore band

Government organs
 Innovation and Technology Bureau, Hong Kong
 FBI Information and Technology Branch, USA

Military units
 Infantry Training Brigade, of the United States Army Infantry School
 Infantry Training Battalion, of the United States Marine Corps School of Infantry
 Infantry Training Battalion, of the Infantry Training Centre (British Army)

Educational institutions
 Institut Teknologi Bandung (Bandung Institute of Technology), Indonesia
 Institut Teknologi Brunei, now Universiti Teknologi Brunei (University of Technology Brunei)
 Institute of Technology, Blanchardstown, Ireland
 Industry Training Board, found in the history of education in England

Medicine and biology
 Iliotibial band, a tissue in the human leg
 ITB therapy (intrathecal baclofen therapy), a treatment for severe spasticity with an implanted intrathecal pump dispensing a liquid form of the drug baclofen.

Other uses
 itb, an ISO 639 language code for the Itneg language
 ITB, the intermediate block check character in the IBM communications protocol Binary Synchronous Communications
 instruction translation buffer, a type of cache found in the Alpha 21064
 TWTC International Trade Building, Xinyi, Taipei, Taiwan

See also

 ITBS (disambiguation)